The 2020–21 Rutgers Scarlet Knights men's basketball team represented Rutgers University–New Brunswick during the 2020–21 NCAA Division I men's basketball season. The Scarlet Knights were led by fifth-year head coach Steve Pikiell and played their home games at the Rutgers Athletic Center in Piscataway, New Jersey as seventh-year members of the Big Ten Conference. They finished the season 16–12, 10–10 in Big Ten play to finish in a tie for sixth place. As the No. 7 seed in the Big Ten tournament, they defeated Indiana in the second round before losing to Illinois in the quarterfinals. They received an at-large bid to the NCAA tournament, their first NCAA Tournament appearance since 1991. As the No. 10 seed in the Midwest region, they defeated Clemson in the first round before losing to Houston in the second round.

Previous season
The Knights finished the 2019–20 season 20–11 and 11–9 in Big Ten play to finish in a four-way tie for fifth place. Following the regular season, the Big Ten tournament and all subsequent postseason tournaments were canceled due to the ongoing COVID-19 pandemic, effectively ending the Knights' season. In January 2020, Rutgers was nationally ranked for the first time since 1979.

Offseason

Departures

2020 recruiting class

Roster

Schedule and results

|-
!colspan=12 style=|Non-conference regular season

|-
!colspan=12 style=|Big Ten regular season

|-
!colspan=12 style=|Big Ten tournament

|-
!colspan=9 style=|NCAA tournament

Rankings

^AP and Coaches did not release a Week 1 poll, and Coaches did not release a Week 2 poll.

References

Rutgers Scarlet Knights men's basketball seasons
Rutgers
Rutgers
Rutgers
Rutgers